William Leete (1612 or 1613 – 16 April 1683) was Governor of the Colony of New Haven from 1661 to 1665 and Governor of the Colony of Connecticut from 1676 to 1683.

Biography
Leete was born about 1612 or 1613 at Diddington, Huntingdonshire, England, the son of John Leete and his wife Anna Shute, daughter of Robert Shute, a justice of the King's Court. He was educated as a lawyer, and served as a clerk in Bishop's Court at Cambridge, England. He married three times. His first wife, and mother of all ten of his known children, was Anna Payne, daughter of Reverend John Payne of Southoe. They married on 1 August 1636, and she died on 1 September 1668. His second wife, whom he married on 7 April 1670, was Sarah, widow of Henry Rutherford; she died on 10 February 1673. His third wife was Mary, widow successively of Francis Newman and Reverend Nicholas Street; she died on 13 December 1683.

Leete's distaste for the oppression of the Puritans by that court was a key factor in his emigration to Connecticut. On 1 June 1639, William Leete was among the 25 signers of the Plantation Covenant on shipboard.

Career
Leete was town clerk of Guilford, Connecticut from 1639 to 1662, and Justice of the Peace there in 1642. He served as town magistrate at Guilford from 1651 to 1658, and as deputy from Guilford to the New Haven Colony General Court from 1643 to 1649. He was Commissioner of New Haven Colony (1655-1658), Deputy Governor (1658-1661) and Governor of the New Haven Colony from 1661 to 1664. After the consolidation of New Haven Colony and the Colony of Connecticut, he became Governor of the Colony of Connecticut from 1676 to 1683. He is the only man to serve as governor of both New Haven and Connecticut.

Leete is remembered for sheltering the Regicides William Goffe and Edward Whalley in Guilford.  The two former English judges were being sought by King Charles II for signing the death warrant of his father, Charles I.   On Saturday, 11 May 1661, two Royalists arrived in Guilford, armed with an order from the King to seize Goffe and Whalley, and meet with Leete, then the Deputy Governor of the New Haven Colony.   They presented the King's order to Leete, who read it out loud in the presence of several local citizens in a way that publicly revealed the purpose of their visit.  After first claiming that he could not permit a search in New Haven without first consulting with the colony's magistrates, Leete then agreed to furnish fresh horses to the men to resume their travels immediately.  However, he delayed the production of the horses until it was too late in the afternoon for the pursuers to depart that day.   With the Sabbath beginning at sundown, the pursuers were unable to leave Guilford until the following Monday.   Meanwhile, advance notice of the pursuers' intentions were sent ahead to New Haven and the judges went into hiding on Saturday and evaded capture.

Death and legacy
Leete moved from Guilford to Hartford, Connecticut where he died in April 1683. He is interred there in Hartford's Ancient Burying Ground. His third wife survived him for several months, dying on 13 December 1683. Leete's Island in Guilford/Branford, Connecticut is named for him.

References

External links
http://www.cslib.org/gov/leetew.htm
Frederick Calvin Norton,The Governors of Connecticut, Connecticut Magazine Co., 1905.
http://the-eversdens.co.uk/leetefamily/leetesofeversden.html

See also

1683 deaths
People from Diddington
History of New Haven, Connecticut
New England Puritanism
English emigrants
American Puritans
Colonial governors of Connecticut
Year of birth uncertain
Burials in Connecticut